Joanna Monro (born 1956) is a British actress and former television presenter who, in the 1980s, appeared on the BBC show That's Life! with Esther Rantzen.

In 1974 she appeared in the Doctor Who story Planet of the Spiders, followed by a lengthy spell as 'Anna Newcross' in the BBC soap opera Angels. For three years in the mid-1980s she was a regular in the BBC children's sketch show Fast Forward, and was a member of the BBC's Radio Drama Company.

In the 1990s, she played the conniving Mrs Lyons in the musical Blood Brothers in the West End, and was on the 1995 London cast recording as well as The International Cast Album. She also appeared in the episode 'The Photographer' (1999) in the first BBC series of People Like Us (which aired 1999–2001).

She performed as "Rosie" in Mamma Mia!. She was in the International Tour for 2 years then joined the London cast for a period of 5 years at The Prince of Wales Theatre then at the Novello Theatre. She appeared in character on 31 December 2008 in a West End special edition episode of The Weakest Link on BBC One. She was the 'strongest link', winning over £14,000 which she donated to breast cancer research.

In 2017 she played the part of "June" in Sandi Toksvig's play "Silver Lining" which toured the UK.

Monro appeared in the 2018 feature film Sink.

Radio

References

External links

1956 births
Living people
British television presenters
British television actresses
British radio actresses
British stage actresses
British women television presenters